In particle accelerators, a common mechanism for accelerating a charged particle beam is via copper resonant cavities in which electric and magnetic fields form a standing wave, the mode of which is designed so that the E field points along the axis of the accelerator, producing forward acceleration of the particles when in the correct phase.

The maximum electric field  achievable is limited by a process known as RF breakdown. The reliable limits for various RF frequencies  were tested experimentally in the 1950s by W. D. Kilpatrick.

An approximate relation by least-square optimization of the data yields

This relation is known as the Kilpatrick Limit.

References 

Accelerator physics